Baloch, also spelled Baloch, Beluch and in other ways, may refer to:

 Baloch people, an ethnic group of Pakistan, Iran and Afghanistan
 Baluch, a small itinerant community of Afghanistan
 Balouch, Azad Kashmir, a town in Pakistan
 Baloch (surname), including a list of people with the name

See also
 Balloch (disambiguation)
 Baloch F.C. (disambiguation)
 Balochi (disambiguation)
 Balochistan (disambiguation)
 Baluchi (disambiguation)
 Bloch

Language and nationality disambiguation pages